The Ven. James Davidson was Archdeacon of Bermuda from 1909 until 1924.

He was educated at Durham University and ordained deacon in 1887 and priest in 1888.  After a curacy in Bedlington  he was Rector of Pembroke then Devonshire (both in Bermuda). During World War I he was a Chaplain to the Forces.

He died on 5 December 1933.

References

Alumni of Durham University
19th-century Anglican priests
20th-century Anglican priests
Archdeacons of Bermuda
British military chaplains
Year of birth missing
1933 deaths